Yaha (Pattani Malay: ยาฮา) is a district (amphoe) in the western part of Yala province, southern Thailand.

History
Yaha was separated from Mueang Yala to create the district in 1907.

Geography
Neighboring districts are (from the west clockwise): Kabang of Yala province; Saba Yoi of Songkhla province; Mueang Yala, Krong Pinang, and Bannang Sata of Yala province;  and Kedah state of Malaysia.

Administration

Central administration 
Yaha is divided into seven sub-districts (tambons), which are further subdivided into 49 administrative villages (mubans).

Numbers 5 and 9 belong to the tambons which now form Kabang District.

Local administration 
There are two sub-district municipalities (thesaban tambons) in the district:
 Yaha consisting of parts of sub-district Yaha.
 Patae consisting of sub-district Patae.

There are six sub-district administrative organizations (SAO) in the district:
 Yaha consisting of parts of sub-district Yaha.
 La-ae consisting of sub-district La-ae.
 Baro consisting of sub-district Baro.
 Tachi consisting of sub-district Tachi.
 Ba-ngoi Sinae consisting of sub-district Ba-ngoi Sinae.
 Katong consisting of sub-district Katong.

References

External links 
amphoe.com (in Thai)

Districts of Yala province